Araeocoryne is a genus of fungi in the family Gomphaceae. The genus is monotypic, containing the single species Araeocoryne elegans, found in Malaysia.

References

External links
 

Gomphaceae
Monotypic Basidiomycota genera
Fungi of Asia